Admiral Potter may refer to:

Bonnie Burnham Potter (born 1947), U.S. Navy rear admiral
William P. Potter (1850–1917), U.S. Navy rear admiral

See also
Édouard Pottier (1839–1903), French Navy vice admiral